Antonio Andrew Anderson (born June 5, 1985) is an American former basketball player and the current head coach at Springfield Commonwealth Academy. He majored in interdisciplinary studies at the University of Memphis and played basketball for several years professionally.

College career
Anderson was born in  Lynn, Massachusetts and attended the University of Memphis. In the 2007–08 season (his junior year at Memphis), Anderson started alongside Derrick Rose, Joey Dorsey, Chris Douglas-Roberts, and Robert Dozier. In his senior season he put up career numbers, including 10.7 points per game as well as 5.0 rebounds and 4.1 assists per game. On January 3, 2009, Anderson became only the second player in Memphis history to record a triple-double, the other being Anfernee "Penny" Hardaway, with 12 points, 10 rebounds, and 13 assists in a home game against the Lamar Cardinals.

Professional career
After his senior season, Anderson went undrafted in the 2009 NBA Draft. He was added to Charlotte Bobcats training camp roster, however, on October 22, 2009, he was waived by the Bobcats and joined the Rio Grande Valley Vipers of the NBA D-League.
On February 22, 2010, Anderson was signed to his first of two 10-day contracts with the Oklahoma City Thunder. After his second ten-day contract expired, Anderson rejoined the Rio Grande Valley Vipers.  He scored two points while appearing in one NBA game during his stint with the Thunder.

In 2010, Anderson resigned with the Vipers, with whom he was averaging 9.1 points through 8 games in 2010. He was eventually traded to the Maine Red Claws.

In September 2011, Anderson signed a one-year contract with ratiopharm Ulm in Germany. In November of that year, Anderson requested and received his release and returned to the NBA Development League's Maine Red Claws. On December 25, 2011, he was waived by the Red Claws due to injury. In October 2012, he joined the Saint John Mill Rats of Canada.

See also
 List of NCAA Division I men's basketball players with 145 games played

Notes

References

External links
Antonio Anderson profile-gotigersgo.com

1985 births
Living people
American expatriate basketball people in Canada
American expatriate basketball people in Germany
Basketball players from Massachusetts
Caciques de Humacao players
Maine Red Claws players
Memphis Tigers men's basketball players
Oklahoma City Thunder players
Sportspeople from Lynn, Massachusetts
Rio Grande Valley Vipers players
Undrafted National Basketball Association players
American men's basketball players
Shooting guards